The following is a list of birds of New England.

(I) Introduced - a species introduced to North America by the actions of humans
(E) Extinct - a recent species that no longer exists
(Ex) Extirpated - a species formerly present in New England which still exists elsewhere
(C) Casual - a species that is irregularly found in New England but is not particularly rare
(R) Review list - birds that if seen require more comprehensive documentation than regularly seen species. These birds are considered irregular or rare in New England, rare can range from one bird seen in New England to a few hundred.
(H) Hypothetical - "modern records which are likely accurate, but do not meet the current criteria for a first state record", also includes birds seen out of New England within 270 miles

Ducks, geese, and waterfowl
Order: AnseriformesFamily: Anatidae

The family Anatidae includes the ducks and most duck-like waterfowl, such as geese and swans. These birds are adapted to an aquatic existence with webbed feet, bills which are flattened to a greater or lesser extent, and feathers that are excellent at shedding water due to special oils.

Black-bellied whistling-duck, Dendrocygna autumnalis (R)
Fulvous whistling-duck, Dendrocygna bicolor (R) 
Bar-headed goose, Anser indicus (R) (I)
Snow goose, Anser caerulescens
Ross's goose, Anser rossii (R)
Greater white-fronted goose, Anser albifrons
Pink-footed goose, Anser brachyrhynchus (R)
Brant, Branta bernicla
Barnacle goose, Branta leucopsis (R)
Cackling goose, Branta hutchinsii (C)
Canada goose, Branta canadensis 
Mute swan, Cygnus olor (I) 
Trumpeter swan, Cygnus buccinator (R)
Tundra swan, Cygnus columbianus (R)
Whooper swan Cygnus cygnus (R) (I?) 
Muscovy duck Cairina moschata (R) (I)
Wood duck, Aix sponsa 
Mandarin duck, Aix galericulata (R) (I)
Garganey, Spatula querquedula (R)
Blue-winged teal, Spatula discors 
Cinnamon teal, Spatula cyanoptera (R)
Northern shoveler, Spatula clypeata 
Gadwall, Mareca strepera (n)
Eurasian wigeon, Mareca penelope
American wigeon, Mareca americana 
Mallard, Anas platyrhynchos 
American black duck, Anas rubripes 
Northern pintail, Anas acuta 
Green-winged teal, Anas crecca 
Canvasback, Aythya valisineria
Redhead, Aythya americana
Ring-necked duck, Aythya collaris 
Tufted duck, Aythya fuligula (R)
Greater scaup, Aythya marila
Lesser scaup, Aythya affinis
Steller's eider, Polysticta stelleri (R)
King eider, Somateria spectabilis
Common eider, Somateria mollissima 
Harlequin duck, Histrionicus histrionicus
Labrador duck, Camptorhynchus labradorius (E) (R)
Surf scoter, Melanitta perspicillata
White-winged scoter, Melanitta deglandi
Black scoter, Melanitta americana
Long-tailed duck, Clangula hyemalis
Bufflehead, Bucephala albeola
Common goldeneye, Bucephala clangula
Barrow's goldeneye, Bucephala islandica
Hooded merganser, Lophodytes cucullatus 
Common merganser, Mergus merganser 
Red-breasted merganser, Mergus serrator 
Masked duck, Nomonyx dominicus (R)
Ruddy duck, Oxyura jamaicensis

New World quail
Order: GalliformesFamily: Odontophoridae

The New World quails are small, plump terrestrial birds only distantly related to the quails of the Old World, but named for their similar appearance and habits.

Northern bobwhite, Colinus virginianus

Pheasants, grouse, and allies

Order: GalliformesFamily: Phasianidae

Phasianidae consists of the pheasants and their allies. These are terrestrial species, variable in size but generally plump with broad relatively short wings. Many species are gamebirds or have been domesticated as a food source for humans. Turkeys have a distinctive fleshy wattle that hangs from the underside of the beak and a fleshy protuberance that hangs from the top of its beak called a snood. As with many galliform species, the female (the hen) is smaller than the male (the tom) and much less colorful. With wingspans of 1.5–1.8 meters (almost 6 feet), the turkeys are the largest birds in the open forests in which they live and are rarely mistaken for any other species. Grouse inhabit temperate and subarctic regions of the Northern Hemisphere. They are game and are sometimes hunted for food.

Wild turkey, Meleagris gallopavo
Ruffed grouse, Bonasa umbellus 
Spruce grouse, Falcipennis canadensis
Ring-necked pheasant, Phasianus colchicus (I) 
Heath hen, Tympanuchus cupido cupido (E) 
Willow ptarmigan, Lagopus lagopus (R)
Indian peafowl, Pavo cristatus (R) (I)

Grebes
Order: PodicipediformesFamily: Podicipedidae

Grebes are small to medium-large freshwater diving birds. They have lobed toes and are excellent swimmers and divers. However, they have their feet placed far back on the body, making them quite ungainly on land.

Pied-billed grebe, Podilymbus podiceps 
Horned grebe, Podiceps auritus
Red-necked grebe, Podiceps grisegena
Eared grebe, Podiceps nigricollis (C)
Western grebe, Aechmorphorus occidentalis (R)

Pigeons and doves

Order: ColumbiformesFamily: Columbidae

Pigeons and doves are stout-bodied birds with short necks and short slender bills with a fleshy cere.

Rock pigeon, Columba livia (I) 
Band-tailed pigeon, Patagioenas fasciata (R)
European turtle-dove, Streptopelia turtur (R)
Eurasian collared-dove, Streptopelia decaocto (R) (I)
Passenger pigeon, Ectopistes migratorius (R) (E)
Common ground dove, Columbina passerina (R)
White-winged dove, Zenaida asiatica (R)
Mourning dove, Zenaida macroura

Cuckoos
Order: CuculiformesFamily: Cuculidae

The family Cuculidae includes cuckoos, roadrunners and anis. These birds are of variable size with slender bodies, long tails and strong legs. The Old World cuckoos are brood parasites.

Groove-billed ani, Crotophaga sulcirostris (R) (H) spotted in NJ
Yellow-billed cuckoo, Coccyzus americanus 
Black-billed cuckoo, Coccyzus erythropthalmus 
Common cuckoo, Cuculus canorus (R)

Nightjars and allies
Order: CaprimulgiformesFamily: Caprimulgidae

Nightjars are medium-sized nocturnal birds that usually nest on the ground. They have long wings, short legs, and very short bills. Most have small feet, of little use for walking, and long pointed wings. Their soft plumage is cryptically colored to resemble bark or leaves.

Common nighthawk,  Chordeiles minor 
Lesser nighthawk, Chordeiles acutipennis (R) (H) spotted in NJ
Chuck-will's-widow,  Antrostomus carolinensis (R)
Eastern whip-poor-will,  Antrostomus vociferus

Swifts
Order: ApodiformesFamily: Apodidae

The swifts are small birds which spend the majority of their lives flying. These birds have very short legs and never settle voluntarily on the ground, perching instead only on vertical surfaces. Many swifts have long swept-back wings which resemble a crescent or boomerang.

Chimney swift, Chaetura pelagica
Black swift, Cypseloides niger (R) (H)

Hummingbirds

Order: ApodiformesFamily: Trochilidae

Hummingbirds are small birds capable of hovering in mid-air due to the rapid flapping of their wings. They are the only birds that can fly backwards.

Mexican violetear , Colibri thalassinus (R)
Ruby-throated hummingbird, Archilochus colubris 
Black-chinned hummingbird, Archilochus alexandri (R) 
Anna's hummingbird, Calypte anna (R)          
Rufous hummingbird, Selasphorus rufus (R)
Allen's hummingbird, Selasphorus sasin (R)
Calliope Hummingbird, Selasphorus calliope (R)
Broad-billed hummingbird, Cynanthus latirostris (R)

Rails, gallinules, and coots

Order: GruiformesFamily: Rallidae

Rallidae is a large family of small to medium-sized birds which includes the rails, crakes, coots, and gallinules. The most typical family members occupy dense vegetation in damp environments near lakes, swamps, or rivers. In general they are shy and secretive birds, making them difficult to observe. Most species have strong legs and long toes which are well adapted to soft uneven surfaces. They tend to have short, rounded wings and to be weak fliers.

Clapper rail, Rallus crepitans (R)
King rail, Rallus elegans (R)
Virginia rail, Rallus limicola 
Sora, Porzana carolina 
Common gallinule, Gallinula galeata 
American coot, Fulica americana
Purple gallinule, Porphyrio martinica (R) 
Corn crake Crex crex (R)
Yellow rail, Coturnicops noveboracensis (R)
Black rail, Laterallus jamaicensis (R)

Cranes
Order: GruiformesFamily: Gruidae

Cranes are large, long-legged, and long-necked birds. Unlike the similar-looking but unrelated herons, cranes fly with necks outstretched, not pulled back. Most have elaborate and noisy courting displays or "dances".

Sandhill crane, Antigone canadensis
Whooping crane, Grus americana (R)

Stilts and avocets
Order: CharadriiformesFamily: Recurvirostridae

Recurvirostridae is a family of large wading birds which includes the avocets and stilts. The avocets have long legs and long up-curved bills. The stilts have extremely long legs and long, thin, straight bills.

Black-necked stilt, Himantopus mexicanus (R)
American avocet, Recurvirostra americana (R)

Oystercatchers

Order: CharadriiformesFamily: Haematopodidae

The oystercatchers are large, obvious and noisy plover-like birds, with strong bills used for smashing or prying open molluscs.

American oystercatcher, Haematopus palliatus

Plovers and lapwings

Order: CharadriiformesFamily: Charadriidae

The family Charadriidae includes the plovers, dotterels, and lapwings. They are small to medium-sized birds with compact bodies, short thick necks, and long, usually pointed, wings. They are found in open country worldwide, mostly in habitats near water.

Northern lapwing, Vanellus vanellus (R)
Black-bellied plover, Pluvialis squatarola 
European golden-plover Pluvialis apricaria (R)
American golden-plover, Pluvialis dominica
Pacific golden-plover, Pluvialis fulva (R)
Killdeer, Charadrius vociferus
Common ringed plover, Charadrius hiaticula (R)
Semipalmated plover, Charadrius semipalmatus
Piping plover, Charadrius melodus 
Wilson's plover, Charadrius wilsonia (R)
Snowy plover, Charadrius nivosus (R)
Mountain plover, Charadrius montanus (R)

Sandpipers and allies
Order: CharadriiformesFamily: Scolopacidae

Scolopacidae is a large diverse family of small to medium-sized shorebirds including the sandpipers, curlews, godwits, shanks, tattlers, woodcocks, snipes, dowitchers, and phalaropes. The majority of these species eat small invertebrates picked out of the mud or soil. Different lengths of legs and bills enable multiple species to feed in the same habitat, particularly on the coast, without direct competition for food.

Upland sandpiper, Bartramia longicauda 
Whimbrel, Numenius phaeopus
Eskimo curlew, Numenius borealis (R) (generally considered possibly extinct, but not flagged as such by MARC)
Eurasian curlew, Numenius arquata (R)
Long-billed curlew, Numenius americanus (R)
Bar-tailed godwit, Limosa lapponica (R)
Black-tailed godwit, Limosa limosa (R)
Hudsonian godwit, Limosa haemastica
Marbled godwit, Limosa fedoa
Ruddy turnstone, Arenaria interpres
Red knot, Calidris canutus
Ruff, Calidris pugnax (R)
Broad-billed sandpiper, Calidris falcinellus (R)
Sharp-tailed sandpiper, Calidris acuminata (R)
Stilt sandpiper, Calidris himantopus
Curlew sandpiper, Calidris ferruginea (R)
Red-necked stint, Calidris ruficollis (R)
Sanderling, Calidris alba
Dunlin, Calidris alpina
Purple sandpiper, Calidris maritima
Baird's sandpiper, Calidris bairdii
Little stint, Calidris minuta (R)
Least sandpiper, Calidris minutilla 
White-rumped sandpiper, Calidris fuscicollis
Buff-breasted sandpiper, Calidris subruficollis
Pectoral sandpiper, Calidris melanotos
Semipalmated sandpiper, Calidris pusilla
Western sandpiper, Calidris mauri
Short-billed dowitcher, Limnodromus griseus
Long-billed dowitcher, Limnodromus scolopaceus
American woodcock, Scolopax minor 
Wilson's snipe, Gallinago delicata 
Terek sandpiper, Xenus cinereus (R)
Spotted sandpiper, Actitis macularius 
Solitary sandpiper, Tringa solitaria
Gray-tailed tattler, Tringa brevipes (R)
Wandering tattler, Tringa incana (R)
Lesser yellowlegs, Tringa flavipes
Willet, Tringa semipalmata 
Spotted redshank, Tringa erythropus (R)
Common greenshank, Tringa nebularia (R)
Greater yellowlegs, Tringa melanoleuca
Wilson's phalarope, Phalaropus tricolor 
Red-necked phalarope, Phalaropus lobatus
Red phalarope, Phalaropus fulicarius

Skuas and jaegers
Order: CharadriiformesFamily: Stercorariidae

They are in general medium to large birds, typically with gray or brown plumage, often with white markings on the wings. They have longish bills with hooked tips and webbed feet with sharp claws. They look like large dark gulls, but have a fleshy cere above the upper mandible. They are strong, acrobatic fliers.

Great skua, Stercorarius skua (R)
South polar skua, Stercorarius maccormicki (R)
Pomarine jaeger, Stercorarius pomarinus (C) 
Parasitic jaeger, Stercorarius parasiticus (C) 
Long-tailed jaeger, Stercorarius longicaudus (R)

Auks, murres, and puffins

Order: CharadriiformesFamily: Alcidae

Alcids are superficially similar to penguins due to their black-and-white colors, their upright posture, and some of their habits, however they are only distantly related to the penguins and are able to fly. Auks live on the open sea, only deliberately coming ashore to nest.

Dovekie, Alle alle (C) 
Common murre, Uria aalge 
Thick-billed murre, Uria lomvia (C) 
Razorbill, Alca torda 
Great auk, Pinguinus impennis (E)
Black guillemot, Cepphus grylle 
Long-billed murrelet, Brachyramphus perdix (R)
Ancient murrelet, Synthliboramphus antiquus (R)
Atlantic puffin, Fratercula arctica 
Tufted puffin, Fratercula cirrhata (R)

Gulls, terns, and skimmers
Order: CharadriiformesFamily: Laridae

Laridae is a family of medium to large seabirds and includes gulls, terns, kittiwakes, and skimmers. They are typically gray or white, often with black markings on the head or wings. They have stout, longish bills and webbed feet.

Black-legged kittiwake, Rissa tridactyla
Ivory gull, Pagophila eburnea (R)
Sabine's gull, Xema sabini (R)
Bonaparte's gull, Chroicocephalus philadelphia
Black-headed gull, Chroicocephalus ridibundus 
Little gull, Hydrocoleus minutus (C)
Ross's gull, Rhodostethia rosea (R)
Laughing gull, Leucophaeus atricilla 
Franklin's gull, Leucophaeus pipixcan (R)
Black-tailed gull, Larus crassirostris (R)
Heermann's gull, Larus heermanni (R)
Common gull, Larus canus (R) 
Short-billed gull, Larus brachyrhynchus (R)
Ring-billed gull, Larus delawarensis 
Herring gull, Larus argentatus 
Iceland gull, Larus glaucoides
Lesser black-backed gull, Larus fuscus
Slaty-backed gull, Larus schistisagus (R)
Glaucous-winged gull, Larus glaucesens (R)
Glaucous gull, Larus hyperboreus
Great black-backed gull, Larus marinus 
Brown noddy, Anous stolidus (R)
Sooty tern, Onychoprion fuscata (R)
Bridled tern, Onychoprion anaethetus (R)
Least tern, Sternula antillarum
Gull-billed tern, Gelochelidon nilotica (R)
Caspian tern, Hydroprogne caspia
Black tern, Chlidonias niger
White-winged tern, Chlidonias leucopterus (R)
Roseate tern, Sterna dougallii 
Common tern, Sterna hirundo 
Arctic tern, Sterna paradisaea
Forster's tern, Sterna forsteri 
Royal tern, Thalasseus maxima
Sandwich tern, Thalasseus sandvicensis (R)
Elegant tern, Thalasseus elegans (R)
Black skimmer, Rynchops niger

Tropicbirds
Order: PhaethontiformesFamily: Phaethontidae

Tropicbirds are slender white birds of tropical oceans with exceptionally long central tail feathers. Their long wings have black markings, as does the head.

White-tailed tropicbird, Phaethon lepturus (R)
Red-billed tropicbird, Phaethon aethereus (R)

Loons

Order: GaviiformesFamily: Gaviidae

Loons are aquatic birds, the size of a large duck, to which they are unrelated. Their plumage is largely gray or black, and they have spear-shaped bills. Loons swim well and fly adequately, but are almost hopeless on land, because their legs are placed towards the rear of the body.

Red-throated loon, Gavia stellata
Pacific loon, Gavia pacifica (R)
Common loon, Gavia immer
Yellow-billed loon Gavia adamsii (R)

Albatrosses
Order: ProcellariiformesFamily: Diomedeidae

The albatrosses are among the largest of flying birds, and the great albatrosses of the genus Diomedea have the largest wingspans of any extant birds.

Yellow-nosed albatross, Thalassarche chlororhynchos (R)
Black-browed albatross, Thalassarche melanophris (R)

Southern storm-petrels

Order: ProcellariiformesFamily: Oceanitidae

The storm-petrels are the smallest seabirds, relatives of the petrels, feeding on planktonic crustaceans and small fish picked from the surface, typically while hovering. The flight is fluttering and sometimes bat-like. Until 2018, this family's three species were included with the other storm-petrels in family Hydrobatidae.

Wilson's storm-petrel, Oceanites oceanicus
White-faced storm-petrel, Pelagodroma marina (R)

Northern storm-petrels
Order: ProcellariiformesFamily: Hydrobatidae

Though the members of this family are similar in many respects to the southern storm-petrels, including their general appearance and habits, there are enough genetic differences to warrant their placement in a separate family.

Leach's storm-petrel, Hydrobates leucorhous
Band-rumped storm-petrel, Hydrobates castro (R)

Shearwaters and petrels

Order: ProcellariiformesFamily: Procellariidae

The Procellariids are the main group of medium-sized "true petrels", characterized by united nostrils with medium septum and a long outer functional primary.

Northern fulmar, Fulmarus glacialis
Bermuda petrel, Pterodroma cahow (R?)
Fea's petrel, Pterodroma feae (R?)
Black-capped petrel, Pterodroma hasitata (R)
Trindade petrel, Pterodroma arminjoniana (R)
Barolo shearwater, Puffinus baroli (R?)
Cory's shearwater, Calonectris diomedea
Sooty shearwater, Ardenna griseus
Great shearwater, Ardenna gravis
Manx shearwater, Puffinus puffinus
Audubon's shearwater, Puffinus lherminieri (R)

Storks
Order: CiconiiformesFamily: Ciconiidae

Storks are large, heavy, long-legged, long-necked wading birds with long stout bills and wide wingspans. They lack the powder down that other wading birds such as herons, spoonbills and ibises use to clean off fish slime.

Wood stork, Mycteria americana (R)

Frigatebirds
Order: SuliformesFamily: Fregatidae

Frigatebirds are large seabirds usually found over tropical oceans. They are large, black, or black-and-white, with long wings and deeply forked tails. The males have colored inflatable throat pouches. They do not swim or walk and cannot take off from a flat surface. Having the largest wingspan-to-body-weight ratio of any bird, they are essentially aerial, able to stay aloft for more than a week.

Magnificent frigatebird, Fregata magnificens (R)
Lesser frigatebird, Fregata ariel (R)

Boobies and gannets
Order: SuliformesFamily: Sulidae

The sulids comprise the gannets and boobies. Both groups are medium-large coastal seabirds that plunge-dive for fish.

Masked booby, Slua dactylatra (R)
Brown booby, Sula leucogaster (R)
Northern gannet, Morus bassanus

Anhingas
Order: SuliformesFamily: Anhingidae

Anhingas are cormorant-like water birds with very long necks and long straight beaks. They are fish eaters which often swim with only their neck above the water.

Anhinga, Anhinga anhinga (R)

Cormorants and shags
Order: SuliformesFamily: Phalacrocoracidae

Cormorants are medium-to-large aquatic birds, usually with mainly dark plumage and areas of colored skin on the face. The bill is long, thin, and sharply hooked. Their feet are four-toed and webbed.

Great cormorant, Phalacrocorax carbo
Double-crested cormorant, Phalacrocorax auritus 
Neotropic cormorant, Phalacrocorax brasilianus (R)

Pelicans
Order: PelecaniformesFamily: Pelecanidae

Pelicans are very large water birds with a distinctive pouch under their beak. Like other birds in the order Pelecaniformes, they have four webbed toes.

American white pelican, Pelecanus erythrorhynchos (R)
Brown pelican, Pelecanus occidentalis (R)

Herons, egrets, and bitterns

Order: PelecaniformesFamily: Ardeidae

The family Ardeidae contains the herons, egrets, and bitterns. Herons and egrets are medium to large wading birds with long necks and legs. Bitterns tend to be shorter necked and more secretive. Members of Ardeidae fly with their necks retracted, unlike other long-necked birds such as storks, ibises, and spoonbills.

American bittern, Botaurus lentiginosus 
Least bittern, Ixobrychus exilis 
Great blue heron, Ardea herodias, including A. h. occidentalis, although white variant is rare in New England
Gray heron, Ardea cinerea (R)
Great egret, Ardea alba 
Little egret, Egretta garzetta (R)
Western reef-heron, Egretta gularis (R)
Snowy egret, Egretta thula 
Little blue heron, Egretta caerulea (C)
Tricolored heron, Egretta tricolor (C)
Reddish egret, Egretta rufescens (R)
Cattle egret, Bubulcus ibis 
Green heron, Butorides virescens 
Black-crowned night-heron, Nycticorax nycticorax (C)
Yellow-crowned night-heron, Nyctanassa violacea (C)

Ibises and spoonbills
Order: PelecaniformesFamily: Threskiornithidae

The family Threskiornithidae includes the ibises and spoonbills. They have long, broad wings. Their bodies tend to be elongated, the neck more so, with rather long legs. The bill is also long, decurved in the case of the ibises, straight and distinctively flattened in the spoonbills.

White ibis, Eudocimus albus (R)
Glossy ibis, Plegadis falcinellus 
White-faced ibis, Plegadis chihi (R)
Roseate spoonbill, Platalea ajaja (R)

New World vultures
Order: CathartiformesFamily: Cathartidae

The New World vultures are not closely related to Old World vultures, but superficially resemble them because of convergent evolution. Like the Old World vultures, they are scavengers. However, unlike Old World vultures, which find carcasses by sight, New World vultures have a good sense of smell with which they locate carcasses.

Black vulture, Coragyps atratus (C)
Turkey vulture, Cathartes aura

Osprey
Order: AccipitriformesFamily: Pandionidae

Pandionidae is a family of fish-eating birds of prey possessing a very large, powerful hooked beak for tearing flesh from their prey, strong legs, powerful talons, and keen eyesight. The family is monotypic.

Osprey, Pandion haliaetus

Hawks, eagles, and kites

Order: AccipitriformesFamily: Accipitridae

Accipitridae is a family of birds of prey and includes the osprey, hawks, eagles, kites, harriers, and Old World vultures. These birds have very large powerful hooked beaks for tearing flesh from their prey, strong legs, powerful talons, and keen eyesight.

Swallow-tailed kite, Elanoides forficatus (R) 
Golden eagle, Aquila chrysaetos (C)
Northern harrier, Circus hudsonius 
Sharp-shinned hawk, Accipiter striatus 
Cooper's hawk, Accipiter cooperii 
Northern goshawk, Accipiter gentilis 
Steller's sea-eagle, Haliaeetus pelagicus (R) 
White-tailed eagle, Haliaeetus albicilla (R) (H) spotted in NY
Bald eagle, Haliaeetus leucocephalus 
Mississippi kite, Ictinia mississippiensis (R) (away from Newmarket breeding site)
White-tailed kite, Elanus leucurus (R) 
White-tailed hawk, Geranoaetus albicaudatus (R)
Red-shouldered hawk, Buteo lineatus 
Broad-winged hawk, Buteo platypterus''' 
Swainson's hawk, Buteo swainsoni (R) 
Red-tailed hawk, Buteo jamaicensis 
Rough-legged hawk, Buteo lagopus
Zone-tailed hawk, Buteo albonotatus (R)

Barn-owlsOrder: StrigiformesFamily: Tytonidae

Barn-owls are medium to large owls with large heads and characteristic heart-shaped faces. They have long strong legs with powerful talons.

Barn owl, Tyto alba (C)

OwlsOrder: StrigiformesFamily: Strigidae

Typical owls are small to large solitary nocturnal birds of prey. They have large forward-facing eyes and ears, a hawk-like beak, and a conspicuous circle of feathers around each eye called a facial disk.

Eastern screech-owl, Megascops asio 
Great horned owl, Bubo virginianus 
Snowy owl, Bubo scandiacus
Northern hawk owl, Surnia ulula (R)
Burrowing owl, Athene cunicularia (R)
Barred owl, Strix varia 
Great gray owl, Strix nebulosa
Long-eared owl, Asio otus (C)
Short-eared owl, Asio flammeus 
Boreal owl, Aegolius funereus (R)
Northern saw-whet owl, Aegolius acadicus

KingfishersOrder: CoraciiformesFamily: Alcedinidae

Kingfishers are medium-sized birds with large heads, long, pointed bills, short legs and stubby tails.

Belted kingfisher, Megaceryle alcyon

WoodpeckersOrder: PiciformesFamily: Picidae

Woodpeckers are small to medium-sized birds with chisel-like beaks, short legs, stiff tails, and long tongues used for capturing insects. Some species have feet with two toes pointing forward and two backward, while several species have only three toes. Many woodpeckers have the habit of tapping noisily on tree trunks with their beaks.

Lewis's woodpecker, Melanerpes lewis (R)
Red-headed woodpecker, Melanerpes erythrocephalus (C) 
Red-bellied woodpecker, Melanerpes carolinus 
Yellow-bellied sapsucker, Sphyrapicus varius 
Red-breasted sapsucker, Sphyrapicus ruber (R)
American three-toed woodpecker, Picoides dorsalis (R)
Black-backed woodpecker, Picoides arcticus (C)
Downy woodpecker, Dryobates pubescens 
Hairy woodpecker, Dryobates villosus 
Northern flicker, Colaptes auratus 
Pileated woodpecker, Dryocopus pileatus

Falcons and caracarasOrder: FalconiformesFamily: Falconidae

Falconidae is a family of diurnal birds of prey, notably the falcons and caracaras. They differ from hawks, eagles, and kites in that they kill with their beaks instead of their talons.

Crested caracara, Caracara plancus (R)
Eurasian kestrel, Falco tinnunculus (R)
American kestrel, Falco sparverius 
Red-footed falcon, Falco vespertinus (R)
Merlin, Falco columbarius 
Eurasian hobby, Falco subbuteo (R)
Gyrfalcon, Falco rusticolus (C)
Peregrine falcon, Falco peregrinus

ParrotsOrder: PsittaciformesFamily: Psittacidae

Parrots are small to large birds with a characteristic curved beak. Their upper mandibles have slight mobility in the joint with the skull and they have a generally erect stance. All parrots are zygodactyl, having the four toes on each foot placed two at the front and two to the back. Most of the more than 150 species in the family are found in the New World.

Monk parakeet, Myiopsitta monachus (I)(R)
Carolina parakeet, Conuropsis carolinensis (E) 
Cockatiel Nymphicus hollandicus (R)(I) 
Budgerigar Melopsittacus undulatus (R)(I)

Tyrant flycatchersOrder: PasseriformesFamily: Tyrannidae

Tyrant flycatchers are Passerine birds which occur throughout North and South America. They superficially resemble the Old World flycatchers, but are more robust and have stronger bills. They do not have the sophisticated vocal capabilities of the songbirds. Most, but not all, are rather plain. As the name implies, most are insectivorous.

Ash-throated flycatcher, Myiarchus cinerascens (R)
Great crested flycatcher, Myiarchus crinitus 
Streaked flycatcher/sulphur-bellied flycatcher, Myiodynastes maculatus/Myiodynastes luteiventris (*) (R)
Tropical kingbird, Tyrannus melancholicus (R)
Couch's kingbird, Tyrannus couchii (R)
Cassin's kingbird, Tyrannus vociferans (R)
Western kingbird, Tyrannus verticalis
Eastern kingbird, Tyrannus tyrannus 
Gray kingbird, Tyrannus dominicensis (R)
Scissor-tailed flycatcher, Tyrannus forficatus (R)
Fork-tailed flycatcher, Tyrannus savana (R)
Olive-sided flycatcher, Contopus cooperi 
Eastern wood-pewee, Contopus virens 
Yellow-bellied flycatcher, Empidonax flaviventris (C)
Acadian flycatcher, Empidonax virescens 
Alder flycatcher, Empidonax alnorum 
Willow flycatcher, Empidonax traillii 
Least flycatcher, Empidonax minimus 
Hammond's flycatcher, Empidonax hammondii (R)
Gray flycatcher, Empidonax wrightii (R)
Pacific-slope flycatcher, Empidonax difficilis (R)
Eastern phoebe, Sayornis phoebe 
Say's phoebe, Sayornis saya (R)
Vermilion flycatcher, Pyrocephalus rubinus (R)

ShrikesOrder: PasseriformesFamily: Laniidae

Shrikes are passerine birds known for their habit of catching other birds and small animals and impaling the uneaten portions of their bodies on thorns. A shrike's beak is hooked, like that of a typical bird of prey.

Loggerhead shrike, Lanius ludovicianus (R)
Northern shrike, Lanius borealis

Vireos, shrike-babblers, and erpornisOrder: PasseriformesFamily: Vireonidae

The vireos are a group of small to medium-sized passerine birds. They are typically greenish in color and resemble wood warblers apart from their heavier bills.

White-eyed vireo, Vireo griseus 
Bell's vireo, Vireo bellii (R)
Yellow-throated vireo, Vireo flavifrons 
Blue-headed vireo, Vireo solitarius 
Philadelphia vireo, Vireo philadelphicus
Warbling vireo, Vireo gilvus 
Red-eyed vireo, Vireo olivaceus 
Yellow-green vireo, Vireo flavoviridis (R)
Black-whiskered vireo, Vireo altiloquus (R)

Crows, jays, and magpiesOrder: PasseriformesFamily: Corvidae

The family Corvidae includes crows, ravens, jays, choughs, magpies, treepies, nutcrackers, and ground jays. Corvids are above average in size among the Passeriformes, and some of the larger species show high levels of intelligence. 
Canada jay, Perisoreus canadensis
Blue jay, Cyanocitta cristata 
Black-billed magpie, Pica hudsonia (R)
Eurasian jackdaw, Corvus monedula (R)
American crow, Corvus brachyrhynchos 
Fish crow, Corvus ossifragus (C)
Common raven, Corvus corax

LarksOrder: PasseriformesFamily: Alaudidae

Larks are small terrestrial birds with often extravagant songs and display flights. Most larks are fairly dull in appearance. Their food is insects and seeds.

Horned lark, Eremophila alpestris

SwallowsOrder: PasseriformesFamily: Hirundinidae

The family Hirundinidae is adapted to aerial feeding. They have a slender streamlined body, long pointed wings, and a short bill with a wide gape. The feet are adapted to perching rather than walking, and the front toes are partially joined at the base.

Bank swallow, Riparia riparia 
Tree swallow, Tachycineta bicolor 
Violet-green swallow, Tachycineta thalassina (R) 
Northern rough-winged swallow, Stelgidopteryx serripennis 
Purple martin, Progne subis 
Brown-chested martin, Progne tapera (R)
Barn swallow, Hirundo rustica
Cliff swallow, Petrochelidon pyrrhonota 
Cave swallow, Petrochelidon fulva (R)

Tits, chickadees, and titmiceOrder: PasseriformesFamily: Paridae

The Paridae are mainly small stocky woodland species with short stout bills. Some have crests. They are adaptable birds, with a mixed diet including seeds and insects.

Great tit, Parus major (R)
Black-capped chickadee, Poecile atricapilla 
Boreal chickadee, Poecile hudsonica 
Tufted titmouse, Baeolophus bicolor

Silky-flycatchersOrder: PasseriformesFamily: Ptiliogonatidae

The silky-flycatchers are a small family of passerine birds which occur mainly in Central America, although the range of one species extends to central California. They are related to waxwings and like that group, have soft silky plumage, usually gray or pale yellow in color.

Phainopepla, Phainopepla nitens (R)

NuthatchesOrder: PasseriformesFamily: Sittidae

Nuthatches are small woodland birds. They have the unusual ability to climb down trees head first, unlike other birds which can only go upwards. Nuthatches have big heads, short tails, and powerful bills and feet.

Red-breasted nuthatch, Sitta canadensis 
White-breasted nuthatch, Sitta carolinensis

TreecreepersOrder: PasseriformesFamily: Certhiidae

Treecreepers are small woodland birds, brown above and white below. They have thin pointed downcurved bills, which they use to extricate insects from bark. They have stiff tail feathers, like woodpeckers, which they use to support themselves on vertical tree trunks and limbs.

Brown creeper, Certhia americana

WrensOrder: PasseriformesFamily: Troglodytidae

Wrens are small and inconspicuous birds, except for their loud songs. They have short wings and a thin downturned bill. Several species often hold their tails upright. All are insectivorous.

Rock wren, Salpinctes obsoletus (R)
House wren, Troglodytes aedon 
Winter wren, Troglodytes hiemalis 
Sedge wren, Cistothorus platensis (R)
Marsh wren, Cistothorus palustris 
Carolina wren, Thryothorus ludovicianus 
Bewick's wren, Thryomanes bewickii

GnatcatchersOrder: PasseriformesFamily: Polioptilidae

These dainty birds resemble Old World warblers in their structure and habits, moving restlessly through the foliage seeking insects. The gnatcatchers are mainly soft bluish gray in color and have the typical insectivore's long sharp bill. Many species have distinctive black head patterns (especially males) and long, regularly cocked, black-and-white tails.

Blue-gray gnatcatcher, Polioptila caerulea

KingletsOrder: PasseriformesFamily: Regulidae

The kinglets are a small family of birds which resemble the titmice. They are very small insectivorous birds in the genus Regulus. The adults have colored crowns, giving rise to their name.

Golden-crowned kinglet, Regulus satrapa 
Ruby-crowned kinglet, Regulus calendula

Old World flycatchersOrder: PasseriformesFamily: Muscicapidae

The Old World flycatchers are a large family of small passerine birds mostly restricted to the Old World. These are mainly small arboreal insectivores, many of which, as the name implies, take their prey on the wing.

Northern wheatear, Oenanthe oenanthe (R)

Thrushes and alliesOrder: PasseriformesFamily: Turdidae

The thrushes are a group of passerine birds that occur mainly but not exclusively in the Old World. They are plump, soft plumaged, small to medium-sized insectivores or sometimes omnivores, often feeding on the ground. Many have attractive songs.

Eastern bluebird, Sialia sialis 
Mountain bluebird Sialia currucoides (R)
Townsend's solitaire, Myadestes townsendi (R)
Veery, Catharus fuscescens 
Gray-cheeked thrush, Catharus minimus (R)
Bicknell's thrush, Catharus bicknelli (R) (away from breeding sites) 
Swainson's thrush, Catharus ustulatus 
Hermit thrush, Catharus guttatus 
Wood thrush, Hylocichla mustelina 
Redwing, Turdus iliacus (R)
Fieldfare, Turdus pilaris (R)
American robin, Turdus migratorius 
Varied thrush, Ixoreus naevius (R)

Mockingbirds and thrashersOrder: PasseriformesFamily: Mimidae

The mimids are a family of passerine birds which includes thrashers, mockingbirds, tremblers, and the New World catbirds. These birds are notable for their vocalization, especially their remarkable ability to mimic a wide variety of birds and other sounds heard outdoors. The species tend towards dull grays and browns in their appearance.

Gray catbird, Dumetella carolinensis 
Brown thrasher, Toxostoma rufum 
Sage thrasher, Oreoscoptes montanus (R)
Northern mockingbird, Mimus polyglottos

StarlingsOrder: PasseriformesFamily: Sturnidae

Starlings are small to medium-sized Old World passerine birds with strong feet. Their flight is strong and direct and most are very gregarious. Their preferred habitat is fairly open country, and they eat insects and fruit. The plumage of several species is dark with a metallic sheen.

European starling, Sturnus vulgaris (I)

WaxwingsOrder: PasseriformesFamily: Bombycillidae

The waxwings are a group of passerine birds with soft silky plumage and unique red tips to some of the wing feathers. In the Bohemian and cedar waxwings, these tips look like sealing wax and give the group its name. These are arboreal birds of northern forests. They live on insects in summer and berries in winter.

Bohemian waxwing, Bombycilla garrulus (C)
Cedar waxwing, Bombycilla cedrorum

Old World sparrowsOrder: PasseriformesFamily: Passeridae

Old World sparrows are small passerine birds. In general, sparrows tend to be small plump brownish or grayish birds with short tails and short powerful beaks. Sparrows are seed eaters, but they also consume small insects.

House sparrow, Passer domesticus (I) 
Eurasian tree sparrow Passer montanus (I) (R)

Wagtails and pipitsOrder: PasseriformesFamily: Motacillidae

Motacillidae is a family of small passerine birds with medium to long tails. They include the wagtails, longclaws, and pipits. They are slender ground-feeding insectivores of open country.

White wagtail, Motacilla alba (R)
American pipit, Anthus rubescens

Finches, euphonias, and alliesOrder: PasseriformesFamily: Fringillidae

Finches are seed-eating passerine birds, that are small to moderately large and have a strong beak, usually conical and in some species very large. All have twelve tail feathers and nine primaries. These birds have a bouncing flight with alternating bouts of flapping and gliding on closed wings, and most sing well.

Common chaffinch, Fringilla coelebs (R)
Brambling, Fringilla montifringilla (R) 
Evening grosbeak, Coccothraustes vespertinus 
Pine grosbeak, Pinicola enucleator
House finch, Haemorhous mexicanus (Native to the southwestern U.S.; introduced in the east)
Purple finch, Haemorhous purpureus 
Common redpoll, Acanthis flammea
Hoary redpoll, Acanthis hornemanni
Red crossbill, Loxia curvirostra 
White-winged crossbill, Loxia leucoptera 
Pine siskin, Spinus pinus 
American goldfinch, Spinus tristis

Longspurs and snow buntingsOrder: PasseriformesFamily: Calcariidae

The Calcariidae are a group of passerine birds that have been traditionally grouped with the New World sparrows, but differ in a number of respects and are usually found in open grassy areas.

Lapland longspur, Calcarius lapponicus
Chestnut-collared longspur, Calcarius ornatus (R)
Smith's longspur, Calcarius pictus (R) 
Snow bunting, Plectrophenax nivalis

New World sparrowsOrder: PasseriformesFamily: Passerellidae

Until 2017, these species were considered part of the family Emberizidae. Most of the species are known as sparrows, but these birds are not closely related to the Old World sparrows which are in the family Passeridae. Many of these have distinctive head patterns.

Grasshopper sparrow, Ammodramus savannarum 
Lark sparrow, Chondestes grammacus (R)
Lark bunting, Calamospiza melanocorys (R) 
Bachman's sparrow, Peucaea aestivalis (R) (H)
Chipping sparrow, Spizella passerina 
Clay-colored sparrow, Spizella pallida
Field sparrow, Spizella pusilla 
Fox sparrow, Passerella iliaca 
American tree sparrow, Spizelloides arborea
Dark-eyed junco, Junco hyemalis
White-crowned sparrow, Zonotrichia leucophrys
Golden-crowned sparrow, Zonotrichia atricapilla (R)
Harris's sparrow, Zonotrichia querula (R)
White-throated sparrow, Zonotrichia albicollis 
Vesper sparrow, Pooecetes gramineus 
LeConte's sparrow, Ammospiza leconteii (R)
Seaside sparrow, Ammospiza maritima 
Nelson's sparrow, Ammospiza nelsoni
Saltmarsh sparrow, Ammospiza caudacuta 
Henslow's sparrow, Centronyx henslowii (R)
Savannah sparrow, Passerculus sandwichensis 
Song sparrow, Melospiza melodia 
Lincoln's sparrow, Melospiza lincolnii 
Swamp sparrow, Melospiza georgiana 
Green-tailed towhee, Pipilo chlorurus (R)
Spotted towhee, Pipilo maculatus (R)
Eastern towhee, Pipilo erythrophthalmus 

Yellow-breasted chatOrder: PasseriformesFamily: Icteriidae

This species was historically placed in the wood-warblers (Parulidae) but nonetheless most authorities were unsure if it belonged there. It was placed in its own family in 2017.

Yellow-breasted chat, Icteria virens

Troupials and alliesOrder: PasseriformesFamily: Icteridae

The icterids are a group of small to medium-sized, often colorful passerine birds restricted to the New World and include the grackles, New World blackbirds, and New World orioles. Most species have black as a predominant plumage color, often enlivened by yellow, orange, or red.

Yellow-headed blackbird, Xanthocephalus xanthocephalus (R)
Bobolink, Dolichonyx oryzivorus 
Eastern meadowlark, Sturnella magna 
Western meadowlark, Sturnella neglecta (R)
Orchard oriole, Icterus spurius 
Bullock's oriole, Icterus bullockii (R)
Baltimore oriole, Icterus galbula 
Red-winged blackbird, Agelaius phoeniceus 
Shiny cowbird, Molothrus bonariensis (R)
Brown-headed cowbird, Molothrus ater 
Rusty blackbird, Euphagus carolinus 
Brewer's blackbird, Euphagus cyanocephalus (R)
Boat-tailed grackle, Quiscalus major (R)
Great-tailed grackle, Quiscalus mexicanus (R)
Common grackle, Quiscalus quiscula

New World warblersOrder: PasseriformesFamily: Parulidae

The wood warblers are a group of small often colorful passerine birds restricted to the New World. Most are arboreal, but some are more terrestrial. Most members of this family are insectivores.

Ovenbird, Seiurus aurocapilla 
Worm-eating warbler, Helmitheros vermivorus (R)
Louisiana waterthrush, Parkesia motacilla 
Northern waterthrush, Parkesia noveboracensis 
Golden-winged warbler, Vermivora chrysoptera (R)
Blue-winged warbler, Vermivora cyanoptera 
Black-and-white warbler, Mniotilta varia 
Prothonotary warbler, Protonotaria citrea (R)
Tennessee warbler, Leiothlypis peregrina 
Orange-crowned warbler, Leiothlypis celata
Nashville warbler, Leiothlypis ruficapilla
Connecticut warbler, Oporornis agilis
MacGillivray's warbler, Geothlypis tolmiei (R)
Mourning warbler, Geothlypis philadelphia 
Kentucky warbler, Geothlypis formosa (R)
Common yellowthroat, Geothlypis trichas 
Hooded warbler, Setophaga citrina (R)
American redstart, Setophaga ruticilla 
Cape May warbler, Setophaga tigrina 
Cerulean warbler, Setophaga cerulea (R) (away from Pawtuckaway State Park)
Northern parula, Setophaga americana 
Magnolia warbler, Setophaga magnolia 
Bay-breasted warbler, Setophaga castanea 
Blackburnian warbler, Setophaga fusca 
Yellow warbler, Setophaga petechia 
Chestnut-sided warbler, Setophaga pensylvanica 
Blackpoll warbler, Setophaga striata 
Black-throated blue warbler, Setophaga caerulescens 
Palm warbler, Setophaga palmarum 
Pine warbler, Setophaga pinus 
Yellow-rumped warbler, Setophaga coronata 
Yellow-throated warbler, Setophaga dominica (R)
Prairie warbler, Setophaga discolor 
Black-throated gray warbler, Setophaga nigrescens (R)
Townsend's warbler, Setophaga townsendi (R)
Black-throated green warbler, Setophaga virens 
Canada warbler, Cardellina canadensis 
Wilson's warbler, Cardellina pusilla

Cardinals and alliesOrder: PasseriformesFamily': Cardinalidae

The cardinals are a family of robust, seed-eating birds with strong bills. They are typically associated with open woodland. The sexes usually have distinct plumages.

Summer tanager, Piranga rubra (R)
Scarlet tanager, Piranga olivacea 
Western tanager, Piranga ludoviciana (R)
Northern cardinal, Cardinalis cardinalis 
Rose-breasted grosbeak, Pheucticus ludovicianus 
Black-headed grosbeak, Pheucticus melanocephalus (R)
Blue grosbeak, Passerina caeruleaLazuli bunting Passerina amoena (R)
Indigo bunting, Passerina cyanea 
Painted bunting, Passerina ciris (R)
Dickcissel, Spiza americana'' (C)

References

See also
List of birds
Lists of birds by region
List of birds of North America

New England